The following is a list of film franchises with fictional and factual lesbian, gay, bisexual, or transgender characters. The films were released theatrically, direct-to-video, or on a streaming platform (non-television network).

(For fictional queer characters  (the "Q" in LGBT-Q), see lists for asexual, intersex, non-binary, and pansexual characters.)

Film franchises

Film franchises, as well as sequels and prequels, share common universes. The following film series collectively feature LGBT characters in a leading or supporting role (guest characters are also included).

Notes

See also

 List of feature films with LGBT characters
 List of feature films with lesbian characters
 List of feature films with gay characters
 List of feature films with bisexual characters
 List of feature films with transgender characters
 List of animated films with LGBT characters
 List of made-for-television films with LGBT characters
 List of LGBT-related films

References

External links
 GLAAD Media Institute

Lists of character lists
Lists of entertainment lists
Film Franchises With LGBT Characters, List Of
LGBT Characters
LGBT characters